Airtight is a 2014 American thriller film written, produced and directed by Derek Estlin Purvis and starring Aija Terauda, James Patterson, and Michael Engberg. A psychological thriller set in a New York mansion and an homage to Alfred Hitchcock, Airtight is based on the true events that inspired a play in the 1920s, an adaptation by Hitchcock in the 1940s and this feature film.

Plot
Bradley and Connor are intellectual elitists who've secretly been planning to murder a former college classmate and close friend, Ronald. Ronald has gathered all of his family and friends to make a big announcement. What Ronald doesn't know is that he will become the victim when Bradley and Connor decide that natural selection is no longer doing its job. It's up to them to force Ronald to defend himself and prove that only the strong survive. Unfortunately, he is physically overpowered, bound, gaged and put into an airtight, soundproof chest in the middle of the living room that will be the stage for the night's festivities. Once they've sealed the chest, there is only one hour's worth of air. He will slowly suffocate right beneath his closest friends and family without them ever knowing.

Cast
Aija Terauda as Leila
James Patterson as Connor
Michael Engberg as Bradley
Daniel Mian as Rupert
Beau Peregino as Ronald
Sage Kristien as Kendra
Lian Toni Amado as Sam
Chris Scarciotta as Wilson
Alex Tassinari as Holt
Brian Styk as Paramedic #4

References

External links

2014 films
American psychological thriller films
2014 psychological thriller films
2010s English-language films
2010s American films